The Lac de l'Argentella is a reservoir in the Haute-Corse department of Corsica, France.
It was built in the 1870s to supply water to the ore processing plant of the Argentella mines, which refined silver and copper ore extracted from the nearby Capu di l'Argentella.
After a few years the ore supply became uneconomical, and eventually the mines were closed in the 1930s.
Recently there has been discussion on what to do with the aging dam.
It stores water in a dry region, but may be unsafe.

Location

The Lac de l'Argentella is in the commune of Galéria just south of its border with the commune of Calenzana.
It is southeast of the village of L'Argentella on the south coast of the Baie de Crovani.
The Argentella lake and mines can be reached from the D81b coast road from Calvi to Galéria.
A dirt road leads to the ruined buildings, of which a chimney is still visible, and the lake is ten minutes away by foot.

Hydrology

The  Ruisseau de Chierchiu, a stream, enters the reservoir from the south and leaves it to the north.
The Chierchiu is a tributary of the  Ruisseau de Cardiccia, which it joins just after leaving the dam, and which enters the sea to the north of L'Argentella.

Ecology

The reservoir has low biological importance.
Flora include
yellow fleabane (Dittrichia viscosa), blue gum (Eucalyptus globulus), rose (Rubus) species and rough bindweed (Smilax aspera).
Birds include Eurasian jay (Garrulus glandarius).
Reptiles include green whip snake (Hierophis viridiflavus).
Fish include European eel (Anguilla anguilla), common carp (Cyprinus carpio) and largemouth bass (Micropterus salmoides).

Mining operation

The Argentella silver and copper mine was probably first exploited before the 17th century.
Exploitation resumed in 1846.

Around 1870 C. Collas, a wealthy investor, acquired the mine and at great expense set up a large factory to process the ore and a dam to supply water, which were built by the well-known engineers Huet and Geyler.
The ore processing plant covered almost .
Buildings were erected to house several hundred workers, as well as offices, stores, powder magazines and other facilities spread over an area of almost .

The ore supply began to dry up after a few years.
An English company bought the mine in 1886, and Argentella Mining Limited worked the deposit for two years, employing up to 200 workers.
Other attempts were made in the years that followed, but in 1898 most of the equipment was sold.
The copper concession passed through various hands, but on 24 January 1964 the concession was forfeited.

Later developments

The dam became the property of the Moncale and Calinzana communes after industrial exploitation had ended.
The safety of the aging structure became a concern as there are houses and a campsite downstream, which could be flooded if it burst.
In 2015 the engineering firm SAFEGE undertook a study.
Three options were considered: totally destroying the dam, restoring it, or creating an arch in it through which the Chierchiu stream could flow.
At first the arch option was chosen as the least bad of the three, preserving some of the architectural legacy but avoiding the reconstruction cost.

During the drought of the summer of 2017 this was reconsidered, since destroying a reservoir in an arid zone during a water crisis did not seem a reasonable option, and farmers were asking if the water could be used for agriculture.
As of 2018 studies were being conducted to confirm the quality of the stored water and the watershed, where the old mine had extracted heavy metals, mainly lead, silver and copper.

Gallery

Notes

Sources

Reservoirs of Haute-Corse